"Wrong Impression" is a song by Australian singer-songwriter Natalie Imbruglia. The song was written by Imbruglia and Gary Clark and was released as the second single (first in the United States) from Imbruglia's second studio album, White Lilies Island (2001), on 11 January 2002. The single reached the top 10 on both the UK and New Zealand singles charts and found moderate success in Australia, the United States, and Europe.

Track listings
Australasian and Japanese CD single; UK cassette single
 "Wrong Impression" (radio mix) – 3:24
 "Always Never" – 4:10
 "Hide Behind the Sun" – 3:37

UK CD single
 "Wrong Impression" (radio mix) – 3:24
 "Always Never" – 4:10
 "Hide Behind the Sun" – 3:37
 "Wrong Impression" (video)

European CD single
 "Wrong Impression" (radio mix) – 3:24
 "Always Never" – 4:10

Credits and personnel
Credits are lifted from the White Lilies Island album booklet.

Studios
 Drums recorded at Metropolis (London, England)
 Mixed at Whitfield Street Studio C (London, England)
 Mastered at 360 Mastering (London, England)

Personnel

 Natalie Imbruglia – writing
 Tessa Niles  – backing vocals
 Gary Clark – writing, guitars
 Neil Taylor – guitars
 Phil Thornalley – bass
 Ian Stanley – keyboards, production, engineering
 Chuck Sabo – drums
 Maz – drums
 Marc Fox – percussion
 John Dunne – programming
 Tom Elmhirst – recording (drums)
 Dave Bascombe – mixing
 Andrew Nicholls – mixing assistance
 Jo Buckley – assistant engineering
 Dick Beetham – mastering

Charts

Weekly charts

Year-end charts

Release history

References

2002 singles
2002 songs
Bertelsmann Music Group singles
Music videos directed by Francis Lawrence
Music videos credited to Alan Smithee
Natalie Imbruglia songs
RCA Records singles
Songs written by Gary Clark (musician)
Songs written by Natalie Imbruglia